Jane E. Taylour (born c.1827 - died 1905) was a Scottish suffragist and women's movement campaigner, and one of the first women to give lectures in public. She travelled around Scotland and northern England as a suffrage lecturer, and was a key figure in spreading the message of the women's suffrage throughout Scotland.

Life 
Taylour was born in 1827 or 1828, in Stranraer, Scotland, to Maria Angus and Nathaniel Taylor. She lived in Balfour. In 1861 she moved to Saffron Walden in Essex, where in 1901 she was recorded as living with Rachel P. Robson. Taylour died in Saffron Walden on 25 February 1905. She was interred in the Society of Friends' burial ground.

Campaigning for women's suffrage 
Jane Taylour addressed gave public lectures and lecture tours on women's suffrage in London, the North-East of England and in Scotland. She sent in a petition in favour of Jacob Bright's Bill to remove women's electoral disabilities. She was described by women's rights activist Clementia Taylor as "the energetic little woman from Stranraer". In 1869 Clementia Taylor asked Taylour to undertake a lecture tour, and from 1870 she gave public lectures throughout Scotland and Northeast England campaigning for women's equality and suffrage. She was accompanied on some of her lecture tours in Scotland by fellow campaigners Mary Hill Burton and Agnes McLaren. McLaren and Taylour travelled to the north of Scotland because "everything that could be done in Edinburgh had been done", as members of the Edinburgh National Society for Women's Suffrage and county members had voted and petitioned, and the Town Council had petitioned in favour of votes for women.

The meetings were popular, and in some cases people had to be turned away, and Taylour's lectures were given extensive media coverage; The Orkney Herald gave her lectures in Orkney full coverage and reproduced her speeches in full, and her speech in Lerwick in Shetland on 12 September 1873 was fully reported in The Shetland Times. The Women's Suffrage Journal commented about one of her lectures that "Miss Taylour has all the requisites of a public lecturer. Her composition is chaste and elegant, her voice distinct and agreeable, and her manner attractive and graceful".

Taylour delivered a number of lectures in Gainsborough, Lincolnshire. On 12 March 1885 she was one of several speakers at the Temperance Hall, along with Florence Balgarnie, Jessie Tod, and Ann Radford McCormick. She returned two years later on 18 January 1887 to give a lecture on allowing women greater political and social equality with men, and returned to Gainsborough again on 31 May 1885 on women and politics at the Methodist Mutual Improvement Association.

By 1873 she had delivered over 150 lectures in Scotland. Women's suffrage committees were formed in Tain, Dingwall, Forres, Elgin, Banff, Invergordon, Nairn and Dunkeld as a result of Taylour and McLaren's campaigns in these towns.

Taylour was the First Honorary Secretary of the Galloway branch of the National Society for Women's Suffrage from 1870 to 1872. She was joint Secretary of the Edinburgh National Society for Women's Suffrage, one of the first three suffrage societies to be formed in Britain, with Agnes McLaren from 1873 to 1876, and an executive member of the central committee of the national Society. In 1901 she was a vice-president of the National Union of Women's Suffrage Societies. In Saffron Walden, in 1895, she was Secretary of the local branch of the British Women's Temperance Association, and was influential in getting women appointed to the local Board of Guardians.

See also 
 Suffragette
 Women's suffrage in the United Kingdom

References 

1905 deaths
1827 births
Scottish suffragists